The siege of Kinsale, or battle of Kinsale, was the ultimate battle in England's conquest of Gaelic Ireland, commencing in October 1601, near the end of the reign of Queen Elizabeth I, and at the climax of the Nine Years' War—a campaign by Hugh O'Neill, Hugh Roe O'Donnell and other Irish lords against English rule.

Owing to Spanish involvement, and the strategic advantages to be gained, the battle also formed part of the Anglo-Spanish War, the wider conflict of Protestant England against Catholic Spain.

Background

Ireland had been claimed as a lordship by the English Crown since 1175 but had never been fully subjected. By the 1350s, England's sphere of influence had shrunk to the Pale, the area around Dublin, with the rest of the country under the rule of Gaelic lords. The Tudor monarchs, beginning with Henry VIII, attempted to reassert their authority in Ireland with a policy of conquest and colonisation. In 1594, forces in Ulster under the previously loyal Earl of Tyrone, Hugh O'Neill, rebelled. Hugh Roe O'Donnell and Hugh Maguire joined Tyrone's rebellion. A string of battlefield victories from 1593 to 1599, and an expansion of the war from Ulster through the midlands and into Munster, had wrested control of most of the island from the English Crown. By the end of 1599, the English controlled little beyond the walled towns and regional garrisons.

Following the failure of the Spanish Armada in 1588, Philip II decided to take advantage of the Irish rebels in order to create a new front in the war against England. Spanish aid was offered to the Irish rebels in the expectation that tying the English down in Ireland might draw English resources away from their allies in the Netherlands, the Dutch Estates, which were engaged in a long rebellion against Spanish rule, and provide another base for privateers, such as the Dunkirkers, to disrupt English and Dutch shipping. The 2nd Spanish Armada aimed at supporting the rebels, but it was smashed by storms off Cape Finisterre in October 1596. The ill Philip sent forth another armada the following year, but this too failed due to storms, bad luck and bad planning.

Spanish landing
After Philip II's death, Philip III continued to provide direct support (material support had been sent for years) to the Irish rebels fighting England. In 1601, Philip sent Don Juan del Águila and Don Diego Brochero to Ireland with 6,000 men and a significant amount of arms and ammunition. Bad weather separated the ships and nine of them, carrying the majority of the veteran soldiers and gunpowder, had to turn back. The remaining 4000 men disembarked at Kinsale, just south of Cork on 2 October 1601. Another force commanded by Alonso de Ocampo managed to land at Baltimore. The Spaniards rushed to fortify these footholds to withstand the approaching English armies.

Though the Spanish army had secured the town of Kinsale, they failed to expand their base into the surrounding region and were vulnerable to becoming besieged by English forces. On hearing of the Spanish landing, Charles Blount, Lord Mountjoy, the assigned Lord Deputy of Ireland, weakened the garrisons around the Pale and rushed to Kinsale with as many men as he could take.

Siege
On 2 October, Mountjoy laid siege to Kinsale, and reinforcements were brought in through Oysterhaven, bringing the army's numbers up to 12,000, including a large force under Irish nobleman Donogh O'Brien, 4th Earl of Thomond. However many of these were Irish levies, and many were not suited to siege warfare, especially in winter. Many fell ill, leaving about 7,500 capable of fighting.

At the same time, the Gaelic Earls Hugh O'Neill and his ally O'Donnell considered their positions. Their difficulty was that the Spanish had landed on the south coast of Ireland, far away from the areas under control of the Irish chieftains. In order to bring aid to the Spanish troops they would have to lead their troops into regions where support for their cause was doubtful. They hesitated for weeks as autumn turned into a particularly wet and stormy winter. The besieged Spanish garrison began to suffer from the lack of supplies and privation, and O'Neill was forced to go to their aid. He fully understood that should this first Spanish force suffer defeat, he would be unlikely to receive further military help. The decision of the Spanish to land at Kinsale forced O'Neill to agree with his more impetuous ally, Red Hugh O'Donnell, to abandon his hitherto successful guerilla tactics and risk open confrontation. A large force would be necessary; larger than they could afford to lose. They set out on a  winter march, separately to ease supply, O'Neill with 2500 foot and 500 horse and O'Donnell with 1500 foot and 300 horse. After a few deceptions and some hard marching in hazardous conditions, the two forces rendezvoused and encamped at Kinalmeaky to rest and provision the army where they were joined by additional forces from Leinster and Munster.

Lord Mountjoy's forces were incapable of surrounding the town of Kinsale and its surrounding area (now called Belgooly), but they seized some higher ground and subjected the Spanish forces to constant artillery fire. The English navy under Admiral Richard Leveson arrived with a squadron of ten ships and cut off the town from the sea. The English cavalry rode through the surrounding countryside destroying livestock and crops, while both sides called for allegiance from the population. O'Neill and O'Donnell were hesitant about leaving Ulster vulnerable to attack by marching south, especially given the lack of supplies for their troops. When they set out, they successfully cut English supply lines across the island and, by December, the shortage of supplies and the severe weather had begun to take a toll on the besieging English army, with many dying of dysentery and fever.

Reinforcements arrived from Spain at Castlehaven, and on 24 December 1601(English date, 3 January 1602 for the Catholic Irish and Spanish armies) moved into position at Coolcarron about three miles from the English camp. At about midnight the Irish in two columns, led by, Hugh O'Neill, and O'Donnell, set out from their camp at Coolcarron and marched for the ridgeline at Ardmartin overlooking the English encampment. The English scouts of Sir Richard Greames horse on outpost that night had been supposedly made aware of these movements when they observed the lit match of the Irish arquebusiers in the gloomy pre dawn moving into position on Ardmartin. Mountjoy being immediately made aware of the intelligence that the Irish were within three quarters of a mile of his camp beat to arms and sent the Marshal Sir Richard Wingfield to further appraise the situation who quickly returned to confirm the message. Mountjoy meantime organized his troops to defend the main and lesser camps however the situation was dire for the English as desertion, sickness and casualties had reduced the besieging army by nearly 50%. The great camp on the Northside was entrusted to the command of Colonel Sir Benjamin Berry with five regiments of foot, the Lord Deputys (715 men) of whom he was Lieutenant Colonel, the Lord Presidents (536 men), the Earl of Clanrickards (529 men), Lord Audlies (370 men) and Colonel Sir Richard Moryson (541). The lesser camp was commanded by the Earl of Thomond with his own regiment (572 men) and three others, Colonel Sir Richard Percy (544 men), Colonel Sir Charles Wilmot (454 men) and Colonel Sir Christopher Laurence (747 men). Mountjoy satisfied that his camps were protected as best they could be led his remaining forces to the Northwest to meet the Irish.

Battle of Kinsale

Initial moves
The Irish force that arrived at Ardmartin in the pre dawn consisted of over 6,000 men in two columns 400 Leinster men under Richard Tyrrell, 1,000 Munstermen, 159 Spaniards in five companies of Foot, 2500 foot and 500 light horse under O'Neill and 1500 foot and 300 light horse under O'Donnell. Many accounts speak of three battles the vanguard the centre and the rearguard but it would seem that a small squadron volant (559 men) was formed from a part of O'Neill's column consisted of Tyrrell's Leinstermen and the Spanish foot. As Mountjoy left camp in the company of Carew the Lord President all that was immediately available to the English were the remaining 400 horse of the severely depleted cavalry approximately nine troops in total. These mounted men along with Sir Henry Powers Squadron Volant (449 men) had been sent under the command of Sir Richard Wingfield to observe the movements of the Irish and ascertain their intentions. Powers squadron volant was an ad-hoc regiment created by combining one company from each of the nine regiments making up the siege force. These troops had been used for the outposts and had been on duty the last three nights on constant alert to any alarms originating from the Irish camp.

Advancing toward Ardmartin, Wingfield observed the Irish Squadron Volant under Richard Tyrell approaching the Earl of Thomond's camp who upon seeing the English, halted. Following behind was the main battle of O'Neill about 400 yards distant advancing in good order along the ridge line screened by their cavalry. At this stage Mountjoy joined up with Wingfield's forces, and seeing the Irish in force decided to offer battle immediately. He ordered Sergeant Major John Berkeley to return to camp and bring up the two regiments of Colonel Sir Oliver St John's (515 men) and Colonel Sir Henry Follyot (595 men) to support Wingfield. O'Neill noting the advance of the English called a halt, ordering his forces to retire off Ardmartin, back towards the Millwater. Wingfield losing sight of the Irish retiring off the ridgeline asked for permission to pursue and attack. Having gained its summit, he noted that the Irish had fallen back in good order down the hill across a ford, and having passed a boggy area, formed up on solid ground on the other side. O'Neill's intention was that the boggy ground would offer protection against the English horse and funnel the English across the fords into his waiting shot. At this point the Earl of Clanrickard was insistent that the Marshal immediately cross the ford and engage the Irish.

Irish rout
Wingfield forming a forlorn hope with a company of foot (100 men) under Lieutenant Cowel supported by Sir Henry Danvers' Horse (100 men) engaged the Irish skirmishers on the opposite side of the bog and feeding in more shot forced the Irish to retire on their main battle. This retirement exposed another route across the bog which was exploited by the English horse. The troops of Clanrickard, Greames, Tasse, Fleming, Danvers, Godolphin and Mitchell were able to cross over and outflank the Irish.

The English horse were immediately supported by 200 shot of the squadron volant who upon crossing were charged by the Irish horse who were in turn broken by an English volley which unhorsed a few riders and brought down one horse causing them to break and flee, straight back into O'Neill's main battle disorganizing it. Seeing their opportunity the English horse led by Wingfield charged home into the disorganized Irish battle and caused a total rout of O'Neill's men who were ferociously pursued without quarter by the cavalry. With the rout of O'Neill, Mountjoy sent word to Captain Francis Roe who was Lieutenant Colonel of St John's Regiment to advance with his men across the bog and charge the flank of Tyrrell's Squadron.

Spanish rout
The Irish squadron volant seeing the rout of O'Neill's main force and receiving some fire from St John's skirmishers began to retire, and the Irish began to flee on foot. They began to outpace their heavily equipped Spanish allies who were abandoned. They were then set upon by the Lord Deputy's troop of Horse led by Sir William Godolphin. The Spanish under Captain Don Alonzo Del Campo resisted fiercely but were hacked to pieces and Del Campo, Captain Pereyra, seven Lieutenants and forty men were captured unhurt with up to seventy men killed and three of the five companies' colours captured.

O'Donnell's rearguard for some reason arrived late to the battle and was not engaged and seeing the rout of O'Neill retired back the way he had come. With his decision to retreat from Ardmartin, O'Neill turned the initiative over to the English. and although he retreated in good order his troops were not adequately trained or disciplined to stand in Tercio formation and absorb punishment as was that formations design. Most of the Irish fled back to Ulster, though a few remained to continue the war with O'Sullivan Beare and Dermot Maol MacCarthy Reagh.

Surrender
The English resumed their encirclement of Kinsale, Del Águila saw his position as hopeless without effective action from the Irish lords. The Spanish, who had lost many men in the siege, gave up the town to Mountjoy "on Terms" and were allowed to sail back to Spain, not knowing that another Spanish force had been sent and was within a few days of arriving. The Spanish were given honourable terms and surrendered Kinsale with their colours flying, and it was agreed that they were to be conveyed back to Spain on giving up their other garrisons of Dunboy, Baltimore, and Castlehaven. The further Spanish force which had been sent never landed; on receipt of news of Águila's surrender, they promptly turned back to Spain.

Aftermath

The Irish light horse were not suited to shock action and were no match for the English horse as decimated, but they still had the advantage in horseflesh, tactics, discipline and offensive arms. It also showed the strength of the English cavalry techniques using the lance, as compared with the Irish method of no stirrup and overhead spear throwing. The resulting tactics showed that the Irish infantry were poorly trained for pitched battle in formation against a well-drilled professional army and for years the English had been praying for a chance to get the Irish on a broad open field. The result that the English were easily able to defeat and rout three times their number showed the weakness of the Irish forces in a conventional battle.

This loss put an end to Spanish help in Ireland and to much of the Irish resistance. The Ulster forces returned to their home province, and after two more years of attrition, the last of them surrendered in 1603, just after the death of Queen Elizabeth. In the following year England and Spain agreed to make peace with the signing of the Treaty of London.

O’Donnell went to Castlehaven and took a ship to Spain. He was well received there but died a few months later, said to be by poisoning by George Carew’s spy, Blake.

O’Neill returned to his native Ulster and continued to fight, but his aura of invincibility was broken. He submitted to the crown at Mellifont on 30 March 1603, where he received generous terms. Four years later he decided to go to Spain. O'Neill was accompanied by many supporters and other chieftains in what is known as the "Flight of the Earls".  Their intention was always to raise an army and oust English authority in their home province, but the territories they had left behind were soon divided up in the Plantation of Ulster, and they were never able to return.

The English administration saw the ideal opportunity to seize most of the land of Ulster, and to bring in Presbyterian Lowland Scots and northern English settlers to farm it. The English had achieved their objectives of destroying the old Gaelic order, ridding themselves of the clan system and the more troublesome chieftains.

The result of the battle of Kinsale was devastating to the existing Irish culture and way of life, as the old Gaelic system was finally broken. As the Gaelic aristocracy fled to continental Europe, they left behind a power vacuum that the authority of the English filled.

See also
 Nine Years' War (Ireland)
 Irish battles
 History of Ireland (1536–1691)

Notes

References
 León Arsenal, Fernando Prado, Rincones de historia española (EDAF, 2008) 
 Richard Bagwell, Ireland under the Tudors 3 vols. (London, 1885–1890)
 Calendar of State Papers: Carew MSS. 6 vols (London, 1867–1873).
 Calendar of State Papers: Ireland (London)
 Nicholas Canny The Elizabethan Conquest of Ireland: A Pattern Established, 1565–76 (London, 1976) .
 Nicholas Canny Making Ireland British, 1580–1650 (Oxford University Press, 2001) .
 André Corvisier, John Childs A dictionary of military history and the art of war (Wiley-Blackwell, 1994) 
 Davis, Paul K. (2001). "Besieged: 100 Great Sieges from Jericho to Sarajevo." Oxford: Oxford University Press.
 Steven G. Ellis Tudor Ireland (London, 1985) .
 Colm Lennon Sixteenth Century Ireland — The Incomplete Conquest (Dublin, 1995) .
 Samuel Lewis, A Topographical Dictionary of Ireland: Comprising the Several Counties; Cities; Boroughs; Corporate, Market, and Post Towns; Parishes; and Villages; with Historical and Statistical Descriptions: Embellished with Engravings of the Arms of the Cities, Bishoprics, Corporate Towns, and Boroughs; and of the Seals of the Several Municipal Corporations (S. Lewis, 1837)
 Gerard Anthony  Hayes McCoy Irish Battles (Belfast, 1989) .
 Hiram Morgan (ed) The Battle of Kinsale (Cork, 2006).
 Hiram Morgan. Tyrone's Rebellion: The Outbreak of the Nine Years War in Tudor Ireland (Royal Historical Society Studies in History) (1999). Boydell Press, 
 John O'Donovan (ed.) Annals of Ireland by the Four Masters (1851).
 Standish O'Grady (ed.) "Pacata Hibernia" 2 vols. (London, 1896).
 James O'Neill, "A Kingdom near lost: English military recovery in Ireland, 1600-03", British Journal for Military History, Vol 3, Issue 1 (2016), pp 26–47.
 James O'Neill, The Nine Years War, 1593-1603: O'Neill, Mountjoy and the military revolution, (Four Courts Press, Dublin, 2017).
 John Powell, Magill's Guide to Military History, Volumen 3 (Salem Press, 2001) 
 ESTEBAN RIBAS, Alberto Raúl y SANCLEMENTE DE MINGO, Tomás: La batalla de Kinsale. HRM. Zaragoza, 2013.
 J.J. Silke The Siege of Kinsale
 Stanley Sandler, Ground warfare: an international encyclopedia, Volumen 1 (ABC-CLIO, 2002)

External links
 The real battle of Kinsale: a three-way tussle of titanic egos, The Irish Times

Conflicts in 1601
Conflicts in 1602
1601 in Ireland
Kinsale 1601
Kinsale 1601
Kinsale 1601
Kinsale
Kinsale
O'Donnell dynasty
O'Neill dynasty
1602 in Ireland